Sauromalus klauberi, commonly called the Catalina chuckwalla or the spotted chuckwalla, is a species of chuckwalla, a lizard in the family Iguanidae. The species was first identified in 1941.

Geographic range
S. klauberi is endemic to Baja California. It is found on the islands of the Gulf of California: Isla Espíritu Santo, Isla Partida, Santa Cruz Island, San Marcos, Santa Catalina, and San Francisco Island.

Etymology
S. klauberi is named in honor of Laurence Monroe Klauber, an American amateur naturalist.

References

External links
 Sauromalus klauberi at the Animal Diversity Web
 Sauromalus klauberi at the National Center for Biotechnology Information

klauberi
Endemic reptiles of Mexico
Fauna of Gulf of California islands
Lizards of North America
Reptiles described in 1941